Donald William Butler (19 March 1910 — date of death unknown) was a British tennis player.

A player from Worcestershire, Butler was a three-time singles champion in Eastbourne. He had his best period on tour in the late 1930s, twice reaching the fourth round at Wimbledon. In 1938 he won the All England Plate.

Butler is the only person to play Davis Cup for Great Britain both before and after World War II. He featured in two ties in 1938, then at the age of 37 in 1947 received another call up, picked over Derrick Barton who was 12 years his junior.

See also
List of Great Britain Davis Cup team representatives

References

External links
 
 
 

1910 births
Year of death missing
British male tennis players
English male tennis players
Tennis people from Worcestershire